Paul Stevens (born 23 July 1953) is  a former Australian rules footballer who played with Collingwood in the Victorian Football League (VFL).

Notes

External links 

1953 births
Australian rules footballers from Victoria (Australia)
Collingwood Football Club players
Living people